Dimitris Theodoropoulos (born 9 May 1998) is a Greek professional footballer who plays as a goalkeeper for Tilikratis.

References

1998 births
Living people
Greek footballers
Super League Greece players
Panetolikos F.C. players
Association football goalkeepers